Drepanopalpia is a genus of litter moths of the family Erebidae. The genus was erected by George Hampson in 1898.

Species
Drepanopalpia cassida Dognin, 1914
Drepanopalpia lunifera (Butler, 1878)

References

Herminiinae
Moth genera